Halosaurus radiatus, also known as the Albatross halosaur, is a fish in the family Halosauridae.

References

Halosauridae
Fish described in 1899